Zura Begum (Rohingya), also known as Aye Nyunt, was one of the first two female legislators of the Union of Burma, along with Khin Kyi. She was a politician from Arakan State of Maungdaw, Burma (now Rakhine State, Myanmar). She was elected to the Parliament of Burma during the 1951 Burmese general election, as the representative of Maungdaw-2 constituency.

References

Burmese Muslims
Burmese politicians
Rohingya politicians
Burmese women in politics